Herbert Gray was Archdeacon of Leighlin from 1661 to 1662.

References

Irish Anglicans
Alumni of Trinity College Dublin
Archdeacons of Leighlin
1662 deaths